"Huuda!" ("Scream!") is a Finnish-language song by Finnish pop rock band Haloo Helsinki!. It was released on 30 November 2012 by Ratas Music as the lead single from their fourth studio album Maailma on tehty meitä varten.

Track listing

Charts

References

External links
 Official music video of "Huuda" on YouTube

2012 singles
Haloo Helsinki! songs
Finnish-language songs
Songs written by Rauli Eskolin
2012 songs